Malibato may refer to the following tree species found in the Philippines:

 Hopea malibato
 Shorea malibato